Grandola ed Uniti is a comune (municipality) in the Province of Como in the Italian region Lombardy, located about  north of Milan and about  northeast of Como. As of 31 December 2004, it had a population of 1,281 and an area of 17.3 km².

Grandola ed Uniti borders the following municipalities: Bene Lario, Carlazzo, Cusino, Garzeno, Lenno, Menaggio, Mezzegra, Plesio, Tremezzo.

Demographic evolution

References

Cities and towns in Lombardy